Carlos Feldstedt is a Chilean former professional tennis player.

A lightly built player, Feldstedt played collegiate tennis in the United States for Mississippi State University before competing as a professional. He reached a best singles world ranking of 247 and made a doubles main draw appearance at the 1974 US Open. Back in his hometown of Viña del Mar he later founded a tennis club. His son Andrés is the under 18s coach of the Rafa Nadal Academy.

References

External links
 
 

Year of birth missing (living people)
Living people
Chilean male tennis players
Mississippi State Bulldogs tennis players
Sportspeople from Viña del Mar